Fires of Innocence is a 1922 British silent drama film directed by Sidney Morgan and starring Joan Morgan, Bobbie Andrews and Arthur Lennard. It was based on George Stevenson's novel A Little World Apart.

Cast
 Joan Morgan as Helen Dalmaine 
 Bobbie Andrews as Arthur Dalmaine  
 Arthur Lennard as Rev. Dalmaine 
 Marie Illington as Lady Crane  
 Madge Tree as Bella Blackburn  
 Nell Emerald as Lydia Blackburn

References

Bibliography
 Low, Rachael. The History of the British Film 1918-1929. George Allen & Unwin, 1971.

External links
 

1922 films
British drama films
British silent feature films
Films directed by Sidney Morgan
1922 drama films
Films based on British novels
British black-and-white films
1920s English-language films
1920s British films
Silent drama films